TMOS may refer to:
 Tetramethyl orthosilicate
 The Mike O'Meara Show
 Time-multiplexed optical shutter
 TMOS, an operating system used in the BIG-IP products by F5 Networks
 Trench-MOS
 Australian Research Council Centre of Excellence for Transformative Meta-Optical Systems (TMOS)